Vermont South is a suburb of Melbourne, Australia, 20 km east of its Central Business District.

The eastern boundary is Dandenong Creek, which flows from the Dandenong Ranges through to Port Phillip. The suburb was mostly developed in the late 1970s and early 1980s, after developers bought the apple orchards in the area.

History

Before the first European colonialists, the landscape was thickly timbered bushland, occupied by the Wurundjeri, Indigenous Australians of the Kulin nation, who spoke variations of the Woiwurrung language group. They were hunters and gatherers, camping near the creeks and gullies of the area now known as Bellbird Dell. The creek flowed from immediately north of the Dell, through it and on to join the Dandenong Creek.

The first settlers, who were woodcutters and charcoal burners, came in the 1850s before land sales. Selectors followed and they marked out, leased and improved allotments, which would enable them to gain freehold titles from the Crown. Temporary wattle and daub huts were erected and later substantial timber cottages.

Apart from some general farming, orchards dominated the landscape until the 1950s and 60s, when the demand for new housing areas led to the subdivision of orchards. Nunawading Council (now Whitehorse Council) began the acquisition of property in 1966, with the purchase of a large block (7.26 hectares) from local orchardist Cecil Rhodes to form Bellbird Dell.

Vermont South was the location of the Australian Gun Club in the 1960s and 1970s.

In 1972, after heavy rains and the increased run-off from the subdivisions caused flooding of Morack Road and the Burwood Highway, Bellbird Dell Creek was barrelled and the natural watercourse disappeared, with the site and its adjoining land reserve as public open space.

Vermont South Post Office opened on 22 October 1974 as the suburb developed.

Landmarks

Pin Oak Court in Vermont South is the filming location for "Ramsay Street" in the Australian soap opera Neighbours. A Neighbours tour bus operates on a regular basis, which is popular with UK backpackers.

Vermont South is the home of the Nunawading Motorcross Track, just off Burwood Highway. Behind the motorcross track are bush walk trails connecting to Dandenong Creek and a spectacular lookout. The lookout is located at the peak of a man-made hill, which is the remains of the former City of Nunawading Tip that was closed in the 1970s. These walking/bike trails (Dandenong Creek Trail) connect to the greater bike trails of eastern Victoria, including the Mount Dandenong National Park and Nortons, Napier and Jells Parks. Sportlink is also a landmark.

The Burvale Hotel is named after its location at the intersection of Springvale Road and Burwood Highway. There is a pub, bottle shop (previously a drive-thru, now developed into a Dan Murphy's store) and motel.

Commercial areas

The Vermont South Shopping centre is located on the Burwood Highway, which contains anchor stores such as Coles, an Aldi supermarkets, a Westpac bank with a variety of small retails shops such as Baker's Delight.  There are adjoining retail outlet franchises such as Coles Express, McDonald's, Pizza Hut, Subway, and a variety of smaller businesses that trade in fast food and miscellaneous services.

On the south side of Burwood Highway is the head office and laboratories of the former Australian Road Research Board, now ARRB Group Ltd. This property has now sold majority of its land to developers, where a retirement village has been constructed.

The following businesses have previously been established in the Burwood Highway front location of Vermont South Shopping Centre: Venture, a Jewells Food Stores, Dan Murphy's Liquor Superstore and "Get Fresh" fruit & vegie and a butcher.

At the end of 2005, the largest Bunnings Warehouse in the world was built in Vermont South. The Australian Lifestyle television program, Better Homes and Gardens, filmed a special at this location.

Transport

The Government of Victoria extended tram route 75 from its former terminus at Burwood East to the Vermont South Shopping Centre in 2005. In addition to the tram, a Transit Bus Link has been added, which travels down Burwood Highway to Westfield Knox Shopping Centre.

This transit bus, named the "Knox Transit Link" runs up to 21 hours per day, in conjunction with the route 75 tram timetable, making a "seamless connection" to and from the tram.

On weekdays it runs from 4:30 am–1:20 am the next morning, running at every 10 minutes in the daytime off-peak period and from every 5–7 minutes in the morning and afternoon peak periods, while after 7:30 pm on weeknights, service intervals are set at every 20 minutes. On Saturdays, the Knox Transit Link bus service runs from approximately 4:30 am–1:20 am the next morning, at 12-minute intervals in the daytime, and every 15–20 minutes beyond the 12 minute interval periods. On Sundays, a 12-minute daytime frequency is offered with a 30-minute service in the early morning and at night, with the last service to run from Vermont South at approximately 12:45 am.

An upgrade in November 2007 saw the introduction of an hourly Sunday service and buses running until 9 pm 7 days a week.

Parks and reserves

Local parks in Vermont South include Billabong Park, Charlesworth Park, Terrara Park, Tyrol Park and the Dandenong Valley Metropolitan Park (west of Dandenong Creek).

Bellbird Dell is a natural park, located in the north of the suburb. It is a 1.4 km linear park with an area of 17.5 hectares, named after the bellbirds that can be heard in the park. The majority of the park is thick bush, however, there are walking trails, wetlands and ornamental lakes. Open grassed areas are provided with picnic tables. For walkers 'The Dell' offers short or long strolls but dogs must be on a leash, as the main pathways are shared with cyclists. Birds and frogs can be seen and heard here and, in spring, there are wildflowers. Victoria's floral emblem, the pink heath (Epacris impressa), can be seen growing wild within the remnant areas.

Hanover Reserve in Vermont South has a playground for children, as well as accessible swings. A pocket guide to Walking and Wheeling in Whitehorse has been produced highlighting some of the parks and walking trails in the municipality.

Education

 Emmaus College – Years 7-12 Campus
 Vermont South Special School
 Weeden Heights Primary School – Established in 1980
 Livingstone Primary School
 Holy Saviour Primary School
 Barriburn Pre-School, Birralee Pre-School Association, Terrara Pre-School Association,
 Vermont South Children's Services Centre

Clubs and facilities

Vermont South Club
Vermont South Club offers Tennis, Darts & Bowls.
$1 million redevelopment works began at Vermont South Club on 3 October 2007. The redevelopment for the Bowling Clubhouse extended capacity from 60 people to 120 people. Other changes proposed include improving disabled access, toilet, shower and kitchen facilities.
More information can be found on their website. Vermont South Club

Sustainability street hub activities
Sustainability Street hubs have been operating in Blackburn, Box Hill, Vermont South and most recently Wattle Hill. Participating communities are guided through a process where they learn about sustainability and how to share practical sustainable principles and actions with others, as well as how to organise themselves as a group in implementing an event/project. The six-month training period is organised around four stages, called mulch (learn), sow (plan), grow (do) and harvest (teach).

Sportlink multipurpose indoor sports facility
A new $8 million, multi-purpose netball stadium was opened in Hanover Road on 7 February 2009. Sharelle McMahon gave a speech and umpired a community netball match for the occasion. It provides for netball, basketball, indoor soccer, badminton and volleyball games, and is already home to local clubs.

To celebrate the opening milestone event, a 'Come and Try Day' was held at Sportlink Vermont South, with the chance to see the new development, watch sports demonstrations and take part in fun activities. Sportlink, which features four indoor and four outdoor courts, includes a multipurpose room, community room, café, first aid room and change rooms. It includes netball, basketball, volleyball, badminton and many more. Planning for this facility started in 2006, with community consultation conducted in November 2006.

Vermont South skateboard ramp
Located at Lookout Trail Park, on the corner of Morack Road and Burwood Highway. The ramp features a vertical half pipe that is suitable for advanced skaters and is built to international standards.

Soccer
The Whitehorse United Soccer Club is located in Vermont South. The men's team won the State League 4 East competition in 2017 and currently compete in the State league 3 south-east competition. The Women's team compete in the newly formed Victorian Premier League Women, having been promoted in 2018 (champions) and 2019.

Other clubs and facilities include:
 Vermont South Tennis Club
 Vermont South Cricket Club
 Whitehorse School of Physical Culture (formerly Vermont South School of Physical Culture)
 Morack Golf Course
 Holy Saviour Tennis Club
 Livingstone Netball Club
 Hi-Lites Netball Club
 Lions Club of South Vermont Inc.

Churches

 Vermont South Evangelical Church
 Holy Saviour Catholic Church
 Anglican Church of the Holy Name of Jesus
 Evangelical Church

Services

Vermont South Metropolitan Fire Brigade (South Vermont Fire Station No. 28) is located at 721 Highbury Road, on the corner of Springvale Road. This Brigade moved from 535 High Street Road, Mount Waverley in 1999. The building has won a design award.

The Vermont South Community House is one of nine community and neighbourhood houses that provide courses and activities for all age groups within the City of Whitehorse. Vermont South Community House was established in 1976 as a sustainable community organisation. An environment has been created, where the community can work together to achieve common goals. The house is run by a volunteer network, who run programs to share information and advocate on behalf of the community. The Community House was the winner of the 2008 Whitehorse Sustainability Awards.

 Whitehorse Manningham Regional Library – Vermont South Campus. The Whitehorse Manningham Regional Library Corporation holds over 421,000 items, which includes books, magazines, audio cassettes, language kits, videos, compact discs, electronic games, sheet music and large print books. Joining the library is free. The library also loans books, talking books, videos, CDs, and CD-Roms in Chinese.
 Vermont Village
 Whitehorse Recycling and Waste Centre processes and manages green waste. It is located at 638-640 Burwood Highway (corner of Morack Road).

People

 Cameron "The Cube" Stollery, speed cubing champion

Statistics
Population of Vermont South:
 2001 Census: 11,655 
 2006 Census: 11,485
 2011 Census: 11,416
 2016 Census: 11,678

See also
 City of Nunawading – Vermont South was previously within this former local government area.

References

Suburbs of Melbourne
Suburbs of the City of Whitehorse